The Central Bureau for Astronomical Telegrams (CBAT) is the official international clearing house for information relating to transient astronomical events.

The CBAT collects and distributes information on comets, natural satellites, novae, supernovae and other transient astronomical events. CBAT also establishes priority of discovery (who gets credit for it) and assigns initial designations and names to new objects.

On behalf of the International Astronomical Union (IAU), the CBAT distributes IAU Circulars. From the 1920s to 1992, CBAT sent telegrams in urgent cases, although most circulars were sent via regular mail; when telegrams were dropped, the name "telegram" was kept for historical reasons, and they continued as the Central Bureau Electronic Telegrams. Since the mid-1980s the IAU Circulars and the related Minor Planet Circulars have been available electronically.

The CBAT is a non-profit organization, but charges for its IAU Circulars and electronic telegrams to finance its continued operation.

History 
The Central Bureau was founded by Astronomische Gesellschaft in 1882 at Kiel, Germany. During World War I it was moved to the Østervold Observatory at Copenhagen, Denmark, to be operated there by the Copenhagen University Observatory.

In 1922, the IAU made the Central Bureau its official Bureau Central des Télégrammes Astronomiques (French for Central Bureau for Astronomical Telegrams), and it remained in Copenhagen until 1965, when it moved to the Harvard College Observatory, to be operated there by the Smithsonian Astrophysical Observatory.

It has remained in Cambridge, Massachusetts to this day. The HCO had maintained a western-hemisphere Central Bureau from 1883 until the IAU's CBAT moved there at the end of 1964, so logically the HCO staff took over the IAU's Bureau.

See also 
 The Astronomer's Telegram
 List of astronomical societies

References

External links 
 IAU: Central Bureau for Astronomical Telegrams homepage
 The Central Bureau for Astronomical Telegrams: A Case Study in Astronomical Internationalism 

Astronomy organizations
Organizations established in 1882
1882 establishments in Germany